Eggplant (Solanum melongena; also named aubergine or brinjal) is a species of nightshade grown for its edible fruit.

Eggplant may also refer to:
 Eggplant (color), a dark purple or brownish-purple color
 Eggplant (software), an automated software testing company, and its products
 Eggplant Wizard, a character in the Kid Icarus video games series
 Robert Eggplant (b. 1973), an American writer, musician, and activist
 Eggplant run, a challenge playthrough of the video game Spelunky centering on an eggplant

See also
 List of eggplant dishes